Pong Pha is a tambon (subdistrict) of Mae Sai District, in Chiang Rai Province, Thailand. In 2017 it had a population of 16,476 people.

Geography
The subdistrict is on the border of Myanmar, formed by the Doi Nang Non mountain range. Tham Luang–Khun Nam Nang Non Forest Park with the Tham Luang Nang Non cave is in the subdistrict.

Administration

Central administration
The tambon is divided into 12 administrative villages (mubans).

Local administration
The area of the subdistrict is covered by the subdistrict administrative organization (SAO) Pong Pha (องค์การบริหารส่วนตำบลโป่งผา).

References

External links
Thaitambon.com on Pong Pha

Tambon of Chiang Rai province